The 2008 Chrono des Nations was the 27th edition of the Chrono des Nations cycle race and was held on 19 October 2008. The race started and finished in Les Herbiers. The race was won by Stef Clement.

General classification

References

2008
2008 in road cycling
2008 in French sport
October 2008 sports events in France